Nampeyo is a crater on Mercury. It has a diameter of 52 kilometers. Its name was adopted by the International Astronomical Union in 1976. Nampeyo is named for the Hopi-Tewa ceramics artist Nampeyo, who lived from 1860 to 1942.

References

Impact craters on Mercury